This is a list of Knights Commander of the Most Exalted Order of the Star of India from 1867 until 1947, when the order ceased to be awarded. It was the second highest class of the Order of the Star of India, following on from the highest class of Knights Grand Commander. Recipients used the post-nominal initials "KCSI" and prefixed "Sir" to their forenames. Wives of Knights Commanders could prefix "Lady" to their surnames. Such forms were not used by peers and Indian princes, except when the names of the former were written out in their fullest forms.

1860s

1867
Daniel Eliott, Madras Civil Service (Retired), late Member of the Law Commission, of the Legislative Council of India, and of the Council of the Governor of Madras
George Frederick Harvey, Bengal Civil Service (Retired), late Commissioner of Agra
Major-General William Hill, late Madras Army, Commanding the Nizam's Contingent during the mutinies of 1857-1858
Major-General Vincent Eyre, Royal (late Bengal) Artillery
The Rajah Jodhbir Chund of Nadown
Henry Lacon Anderson, Bombay Civil Service (Retired), late Chief Secretary to the Government of Bombay, and Member of the Council of the Governor-General of India for making Laws and Regulations
Richard Temple, Bengal Civil Service, Resident at Hyderabad
Colonel Arthur Purves Phayre, Bengal Staff Corps, Chief Commissioner in British Burmah

1869
His Highness the Rajah of Cochin
Lieutenant-General John Campbell, Madras Army
Major-General George Le Grand Jacob, late Bombay Army

1870s

1870
His Highness Prince Gholam Mahomed  
William Grey, Bengal Civil Service, Lieutenant-Governor of Bengal

1871
The Nawab Mohsin-ood-Dowlah Bahadoor of Oude
His Highness Mohubut Khan, Nawab of Joonaghur
Major-General George Inglis Jameson, Bombay Army, late President of the Military Finance Commission for India, Auditor of the Accounts of the Department of the Secretary of State for India in Council
John William Kaye, formerly of the Bengal Artillery, now Secretary in the Political and Secret Department of the Office of the Secretary of State for India in Council
Henry Sumner Maine, late Member of the Council of the Governor-General of India

1872
John Strachey, Bengal Civil Service, Member of the Council of the Governor-General of India
John Cracroft Wilson  Bengal Civi Service (Retired), late Civil and Sessions Judge at Moradabad, and Special Commissioner for the Trial of Rebels and Mutineers in 1857-58

1873
Nawab Khan Bahadoor Khwajah Muhammad Khan Khuttuk, of Kohat
George Campbell, Bengal Civil Service, Lieutenant-Governor of Bengal
Alexander John Arbuthnot  Madras Civil Service, late Member of the Council of the Governor of Madras
Major-General Harry Burnett Lumsden  Bengal Staff Corps, late Envoy to Candahar

1874
Robert Henry Davies  Bengal Civil Service, Lieutenant-Governor of the Punjab
Colonel Richard John Meade  Bengal Staff Corps, Chief Commissioner of Mysore and Coorg
Colonel Lewis Pelly  Bombay Staff Corps, Agent to the Governor-General for the States of Rajpootana, and late Political Resident in the Persian Gulf

1877
Joseph Dalton Hooker  Director of the Royal Botanical Gardens at Kew
Thomas Lawrence Seccombe  Financial Secretary to the Secretary of State for India in Council

1878
The Honourable Ashley Eden  Lieutenant-Governor of Bengal
Stuart Colvin Bayley  Bengal Civil Service, Secretary to the Government of Bengal in the Judicial and Political Departments

1880s

1881
General Orfeur Cavenagh, Bengal Staff Corps
Charles Umpherston Aitchison,  Bengal Civil Service, Chief Commissioner British Burmah
His Highness Tukht Singh, Thakur Saheb of Bhavnagur
James Davidson Gordon,  Bengal Civil Service, Resident at Mysore
John Forsyth,  Inspector-General of Hospitals (Retired), Bengal Medical Service
Lepel Henry Griffin  Bengal Civil Service, Agent to the Governor-General in Central India

1882
The Maharajah Jotendro Mohun Tagore  
Lieutenant-Colonel Oliver Beauchamp Coventry St. John,   Royal (late Bengal) Engineers, late Resident at Kandahar

1885
Colonel Edward Ridley Colborne Bradford, Madras Staff Corps, Agent to the Governor-General.

1886
Theodore Cracraft Hope, Esq., C.S.I., C.I.E., Bombay Civil Service, Member of the Council of the Governor-General of India.
Charles Edward Bernard, Esq., C.S.I., Bengal Civil Service, Chief Commissioner of Burmah.
Nawab Khwaja Abdul Ghani Meeah, of Dacca, C.S.I.
William Chichele Plowden, Esq., Bengal Civil Service (Retired), late Census Commissioner for India.

1888
James Broadwood Lyall, Bengal Civil Service, Lt.-Governor of the Punjab.
Charles Hawkes Todd Crosthwaite,  Bengal Civil Service, Chief Commissioner, Burmah.

1889
Colonel Henry Yule, Royal (late Bengal) Engineers, Member of the Council of the Secretary of State for India.

1890s

1890
Andrew Richard Scoble,  Ordinary Member of the Council of the Governor-General of India.
Dennis Fitzpatrick,  Bengal Civil Service, Resident at Hyderabad.

1891
Philip Perceval Hutchins,  Madras Civil Service, Member of the Council of the Governor-General of India.
 Alexander Mackenzie, Esq., CSI, Bengal Civil Service, Chief Commissioner of Burma.

1892
Sir Auckland Colvin,  Bengal Civil Service, Lieutenant Governor of the North-Western Provinces and Chief Commissioner of Oudh.
Henry Edward Stokes,  Madras Civil Service, Member of the Council of the Governor of Madras.
His Excellency Maharaja Bir Shumsher Jang Bahadur Rana, Prime Minister of Nepal. 
Maharaja Mana Vikrama Bahadur Zamorin of Calicut.

1893
 Anthony Patrick MacDonnell, Indian Civil Service, Chief Commissioner of the Central Provinces.
 Kumarapuram Sheshadri Aiyar, Dewan of Mysore.

1894
Major General Oliver Richardson Newmarch,  Military Secretary at the India Office.
Sir Henry Mortimer Durand,   Secretary to the Government of India in the Foreign Department

1895
Lieutenant-General Sir William Stephen Alexander Lockhart,  
James Westland, Esq, CSI, Member of the Council of the Governor-General of India.
Frederick William Richards Fryer, Esq, CSI, Officiating Financial Commissioner, Punjab.
His Highness Maharao Kesri Singh of Sirohi
Courtenay Peregrine Ilbert, Esq, CSI, CIE

1896
William Erskine Ward,  Chief Commissioner of Assam.
Brigade-Surgeon-Lieutenant-Colonel Alfred Swaine Lethbridge, 
Lieutenant-General Sir Henry Brackenbury, Member of the Council of the Governor-General of India.
Mansinghji Sarsinghji Thakore Saheb of Palitana

1897
John Woodburn, Esq., CSI, Member of the Council of the Governor-General of India.
His Highness Maharao Raja Raghubir Singh Bahadur, Chief of Bundi.
Sir Edward Charles Buck, CSI, Secretary to the Government of India in the Department of Revenue and Agriculture.
William Mackworth Young CSI, Lieutenant-Governor of the Punjab.
Sri Raja Rama Varma of Cochin.
Charles James Lyall CSI CIE, Chief Commissioner of the Central Provinces.
Robert Joseph Crosthwaite CSI, Agent to the Governor-General in Rajputana.
William John Cuningham CSI, Secretary to the Government of India in the Foreign Department.
Major-General Montagu Gilbert Gerard CB CSI, Indian Staff Corps.
Raja Jagatjit Singh Bahadur of Kapurthala.
Richard Udny CSI, Indian Civil Service.
Colonel Howard Melliss CSI, Inspector-General of Imperial Service Troops.

1898
William Lee-Warner, Esq., C.S.I., Political Secretary, India Office. 
Trevor John Chichele Chichele-Plowden, Esq., C.S.I., Indian Civil Service.
His Highness Maharaja Lokindra Bhawani Singh Bahadur of Datia
Arthur Charles Trevor, CSI, Indian Civil Service.
John Frederick Price, Esq, CSI, Indian Civil Service.

1899
 His Highness Rasul Khanji Mahabat Khanji, Nawab of Junagarh
 Charles Cecil Stevens, Esq., CSI, Indian Civil Service

1900s

1901
 James John Digges La Touche, Esq., CSI, Indian Civil Service
 His Highness Raja Surindar Bikram Prakash Bahadur, of Sirmur
 Sultan Ahmed bin Fadthl, of Lahej
 Charles Montgomery Rivaz, Esq., CSI, Ordinary Member of the Council of the Governor General of India

1902
Lieutenant-Colonel David William Keith Barr, CSI, Indian Staff Corps, resident at Hyderabad
Henry John Stedman Cotton, Esq., CSI, Indian Civil Service, Chief Commissioner of Assam
Amaravati Seshayya Sastri, CSI, of Madras

1903
Denzil Charles Jelf Ibbetson, Esq., CSI, Indian Civil Service, Member of the Council of the Governor-General of India.
Rear-Admiral Charles Carter Drury, Commander-in-Chief of His Majesty's Naval Forces in the East Indies.
Henry Martin Winterbotham, Esq, CSI, Indian Civil Service, Member of the Council of the Governor of Fort St. George.
James Monteath, Esq., CSI, Indian Civil Service, Member of the Council of the Governor of Bombay.
Lieutenant-Colonel Donald Robertson, CSI, Indian Staff Corps, Resident in Mysore, and Chief Commissioner of Coorg.
Andrew Henderson Leith Fraser, Esq., CSI, Indian Civil Service, Chief Commissioner of the Central Provinces.
Hugh Shakespear Barnes, Esq., CSI, Indian Civil Service, Secretary to the Government of India in the Foreign Department.
Surgeon-General William Roe Hooper, CSI, Indian Medical Service (retired), President of the Medical Board at the India Office.
Colonel Sir Colin Campbell Scott Moncrieff, KCMG, CSI, Royal Engineers (retired), President of the Indian Irrigation Commission.
His Highness Raja Kirti Sah, of Tehri, Garhwal, CSI
Kunwar Ranbir Singh, of Patiala

1904
Arundel Tagg Arundel, Esq., CSI, Indian Civil Service, an Ordinary Member of the Council of the Governor-General.
James Austin Bourdillon, Esq., CSI, Indian Civil Service, Resident in Mysore and Chief Commissioner of Coorg, lately Acting Lieutenant-Governor of Bengal.

1907
Thomas William Holderness, Esquire, C.S.I., Indian Civil Service (retired), Secretary in the Revenue and Statistics Department of the India Office.
Lancelot Hare, Esquire, C.S.I., C.I.E., Indian Civil Service, Lieutenant-Governor of Eastern Bengal and Assam.

1908
Charles Stuart Bayley, Esq., C.S.I, Indian Civil Service, Officiating Lieutenant-Governor, Eastern Bengal and Assam.
Edward Norman Baker, Esq., C.S.I., Indian Civil Service, Ordinary Member of the Council of the Governor-General.
His Highness Raj Rajeshwar Maharaja Dhiraj Sardar Singh Bahadur, of Jodhpur.
His Highness Raj Rana Bhavvaui Singh, of Jhalawar.
Raja Tasadduk Rasul Khan, C.S.I., of Jahangirabad, Oudh.

1909
John William Pitt Muir-Mackenzie, Esq., C.S.I., Indian Civil Service, an Ordinary Member of the Council of the Governor of Bombay.
Nawab Bahadur Khwaia Salimulla, C.S.I., of Dacca, an Additional Member of the Council of the Governor-General for making Laws and Regulations.
James Wilson, Esq., C.S.I., Indian Civil Service, Financial Commissioner, Punjab, and a Member of the Council of the Lieutenant-Governor of the Punjab for making Laws and Regulations.
His Highness Maharaja Sawai Jai Singh, Bahadur, of Alwar.
Henry Erle Richards, Esq., K.C.. Barrister-at-law, an Ordinary Member of the Council of the Governor-General.
Gabriel Stokes, Esq., C.S.I., Indian Civil Service (retired), lately an Ordinary Member of the Council of the Governor of Fort St. George.
His Highness Farzand-i-Dilband Rasikh-ul-Itikad Daulat-i-Inglishia Raja-i-Rajagan Raja Ranbir Singh, Bahadur of Jind.
His Highness Maharana Shri Ajitsinghji Jaswatsinghji, Raj Sahib of Dhrangadhra.
George Stuart Forbes, Esq., C.S.I., Indian Civil Service, an Ordinary Member of the Council of the Governor of Fort St. George.
Captain His Highness Raja Sajjan Singh of Ratlam.

1910s

1910
Sir James Lyle Mackay, G.C.M.G., K.C.I.E., a Member of the Council of His Majesty's Secretary of State for India.
Sir Harvey Adamson, C.S.I, Indian Civil Service, an Ordinary Member of the Council of the Governor-General of India.
Lieutenant-General Sir Beauchamp Duff, K.C.B., K.C.V.O., C.I.E., Indian Army, Secretary in the Military Department, India Office.
Ihtisham-ul-Mulk Rais-ud-Daula Amir-ul-Omrah Nawab Asif Kadr Saiyid Wasif Ali Mirza Khan Bahadur, Mahabat Jang, Nawab Bahadur of Murshidabad, Member of the Council of the Lieutenant-Governor of Bengal for making Laws and Regulations.
Lieutenant-Colonel James Robert Dunlop Smith, C.S.I., C.I.E., Indian Army, Private Secretary to His Excellency the Viceroy and Governor-General of India.

1911
John Ontario Miller, Esq., C.S.I., Indian Civil Service, lately an Ordinary Member of the Council of the Governor-General of India
Lionel Montague Jacob, Esq., C.S.I.. M.I.C.E., Secretary to the Government of India, Public Works Department, and an Additional Member of the Council of the Governor-General of India for making Laws and Regulations
Murray Hammick, Esq.. C.S.I., C.I.E., an Ordinary Member of the Council of the Governor of Fort St. George
Krishna Govinda Gupta, CSI, Member of the Council of India
Leslie Alexander Selim Porter, Esq., C.S.I., Indian Civil Service, Acting Lieutenant-Governor of the United Provinces of Agra and Oudh.
John Lewis Jenkins, Esq., C.S.I., Indian Civil Service, an Ordinary Member of the Council of the Governor-General of India.
Spencer Harcourt Butler, Esq., C.S.I., C.I.E., Indian Civil Service, an Ordinary Member of the Council of the Governor-General of India.
Robert Warrand Carlyle, Esq., C.S.I., C.I.E., Indian Civil Service, an Ordinary Member of the Council of the Governor-General of India.
Captain His Highness Umdae Rajahae Baland Makan Maharajadhiraja Sir Madan Singh Bahadur, K.C.I.E., Maharaja of Kishangarh.
Reginald Henry Craddock, Esq., C.S.I., Indian Civil Service, Chief Commissioner, Central Provinces.
James McCrone Douie, Esq., C.S.I., Indian Civil Service, First Financial Commissioner of the Punjab, and an Additional Member of the Council of the Lieutenant-Governor of the Punjab for making Laws and Regulations.
James Scorgie Meston, Esq., C.S.I., Indian Civil Service, Secretary to the Government of India in the Finance Department, and an Additional Member of the Council of the Governor-General of India for making Laws and Regulations.
Benjamin Robertson, Esq., C.S.I., C.I.E., Indian Civil Service, Secretary to the Government of India, Commerce and Industry Department, and an Additional Member of the Council of the Governor-General of India for making Laws and Regulations.
Richard Amphlett Lamb, Esq., C.S.I., C.I.E., Indian Civil Service, an Ordinary Member and Vice-President of the Council of the Governor of Bombay.
Maharajadhiraja Sir Bijay Chand Mahtab Bahadur, K.C.I.E., of Burdwan, a Member of the Council of the Lieutenant-Governor of Bengal for making Laws and Regulations.
Elliot Graham Colvin, Esq., C.S.I., Indian Civil Service, Agent to the Governor-General of India in Rajputana, and Chief Commissioner, Ajmer-Merwara.
Sir Trevredyn Rashleigh Wynne, K.C.I.E., V.D., Chairman of the Railway Board and an Additional Member of the Council of the Governor-General of India for making Laws and Regulations.
Surgeon-General Charles Pardey Lukis, C.S.I., M.D., Indian Medical Service, Director-General, Indian Medical Service, and an Additional Member of the Council of the Governor-General of India for making Laws and Regulations.
Stanley Ismay, Esq., C.S.I., Indian Civil Service (retired), Chief Justice of the Chief Court of Mysore.
George Casson Walker, Esq., C.S.I., Indian Civil Service (retired), lately Financial Adviser to the Government of the Nizam of Hyderabad.
Apcar Alexander Apcar, Esq., C.S.I., Consul for Siam in Calcutta.
His Highness Raja Udaji Rao Puar, Raja of Dhar, in Central India.
His Highness Raja Tukoji Rao Puar of Dewas State (Senior Branch), in Central India.
Surgeon-General Francis Wollaston Trevor, C.B., M.B., K.H.S., Principal Medical Officer, India.
His Highness Maharaja 5 Sris Sir Ugyen Wangchuk, K.C.I.E., of Bhutan.

1912
 John Nathaniel Atkinson, Indian Civil Service, an Ordinary Member of the Council of the Governor of Fort St. George.
 William Thomson Morison, Indian Civil Service (Retd.), lately an Ordinary Member of the Council of the Governor of Bombay.

1913
Michael Francis O'Dwyer, Esq., CSI, Indian Civil Service, Lieutenant-Governor of the Punjab.
Lieutenant-Colonel Sir George Olaf Roos-Keppel, KCIE, Chief Commissioner and Agent to the Governor-General of India, North-West Frontier Province.
Sir George Head Barclay, K.C.M.G., C.V.O., lately Envoy Extraordinary and Minister Plenipotentiary at Teheran.
Lieutenant-General Sir James Willcocks, K.C.M.G., C.B., D.S.O., General Officer Commanding the Northern Army in India.

1914
His Excellency Sardar Arfa, Amir Nuyan Sheikh Khazal Khan ibn Haji Jabir Khatij K.C.I.E., Sheikh of Mohammera. (Honorary)
Sheikh Mubarak-bin-Subah, K.C.I.E., Ruler of Koweit.(Honorary)
Michael William Fenton, Esq., C.S.I, Indian Civil Service, Financial Commissioner, Punjab.
Sir Harold Arthur Stuart, K.C.V.O., C.S.I., Indian Civil Service, an Ordinary Member of the Council of the Governor of Fort St. George.
Colonel Sidney Gerald Burrard, C.S.I, F.R.S., R.E., Surveyor-General in India.
Syed Ali Imam, Esq., C.S.I., an Ordinary Member of the Council of the Governor-General of India.
Duncan Colvin Baillie, Esq., C.S.I., Member of the Board of Revenue, United Provinces of Agra and Oudh.

1915
Pazhamaneri Sundaram Sivaswami Iyer , an Ordinary Member of the Council of the Governor of Fort St. George, Madras.
Sir Frederick William Duke , Indian Civil Service (retired), a Member of the Council of India.
Edward Albert Gait  Indian Civil Service, an Ordinary Member of the Council of the Lieutenant-Governor of Bihar and Orissa.
His Highness Nawab Ahmad Ali Khan Sherwani Bahadur, Chief of Maler Kotla, Punjab.
His Highness Raja Amar Prakash Bahadur, Chief of Sirmur (Nahan), Punjab.
Lieutenant-Colonel Alexander Fleetwood Pinhey , Indian Army, Indian Political Department, Resident, Hyderabad.
William Henry Clark , an Ordinary Member of the Council of the Governor-General.
Sir William Stevenson Meyer , Indian Civil Service, an Ordinary Member of the Council of the Governor-General.
Major-General William Riddell Birdwood, C.B., C.S.I., C.I.E., D.S.O., late Secretary in the Army Department to the Government of India.

1916
Alexander Gordon Cardew , Indian Civil Service, an Ordinary Member of the Council of the Governor of Fort St. George, Madras.
Lt.-Col. Sir Hugh Daly , Indian Army, lately Resident in Mysore and Chief Commissioner, Coorg.
Sir Steyning William Edgerley, K.C.V.O., C.I.E., Member of the Council of India.
Harrington Verney Lovett, Esq., C.S.I., Indian Civil Service, Commissioner of the Lucknow Division, United Provinces, and a Member of the Council of the Lieutenant-Governor for making Laws and Regulations.
Robert Woodburn Gillan, Esq., C.S.I., Indian Civil Service, President of the Railway Board.
Maharaj Sri Bhairon Singh Bahadur, C.S.I., Vice-President and Political Member of the State Council, Bikaner, Rajputana.

1917
Sir Charles Edmund Fox, Chief Judge, Chief Court, Lower Burma.
Claude Hamilton Archer Hill, an Ordinary Member of the Council of the Governor-General
His Highness Raja Malhar Rao Baba Saheb Puar, Chief of Dewas (Junior Branch), Central India
His Highness Maharaja Jitendra Narayan Bhup Bahadur, of Cooch Behar, Bengal
His Highness Jam Shri Ranjitsinhji Vibhaji, Jam Saheb of Nawanagar, Kathiawar, Bombay Presidency
His Highness Raj Ganshyamsinhji Ajitsinhji, Raj Saheb of Dhrangadhra, Kathiawar Bombay Presidency
Lieutenant-Colonel Sir Francis Edward Younghusband,  LLD DSc, Indian Political Department (retired)
Sir Theodore Morison, lately a Member of the Council of India
Major-General George Macaulay Kirkpatrick, Chief of the Indian General Staff
Major-General Robert Charles Ochiltree Stuart, Director-General of Ordnance in India

1918
Sir William Henry Hoare Vincent, Indian Civil Service, an Ordinary Member of the Council of the Governor-General of India
Sir Thomas Henry Holland  President, Indian Munitions Board
George Rivers Lowndes  an Ordinary Member of the Council of the Governor-General of India
His Highness Maharajadhiraja Maharawal Jawahir Singh Bahadur of Jaisalmer, Rajputana
Sir Archdale Earle  Indian Civil Service, Chief Comm. of Assam
Stuart Mitford Fraser  Indian Civil Service, Political Dept., Resident at Hyderabad
John Stratheden Campbell  Indian Civil Service, Junior Member, Board of Revenue, United Provinces of Agra and Oudh, and a Member of the Council of the Lieutenant-Governor for making Laws and Regulations
Frank George Sly  Indian Civil Service, Comm., Central Provinces
His Highness Maharaja Lakendra Govind Singh Bahadur of Datia
His Highness Maharajadhiraja Sri Sawai Maharaj Rana Udai Bhan Singh Lokindar Bahadur of Dholpur

1919
Maj.-Gen. Sir Harry Triscott Brooking 
Maj.-Gen. Sir George Fletcher MacMunn  Inspector-General of Communications
Oswald Vivian Bosanquet  Indian Civil Service, Agent to the Governor-General in Central India

1920s

1920
Sir George Stapylton Barnes  Ordinary Member of the Governor-General's Executive Council
Colonel Nawab Muhammad Nasrulla Khan, Heir-apparent to the Bhopal State, Central India
 The Right Honourable Sir Francis John Stephens Hopwood, Baron Southborough, .
 Lieutenant-Colonel His Highness Maharaja Daolat Singhji, Maharaja of Idar, Bombay.
 Diwan Bahadur Penungavur Rajagopala Achariyar Avargal, Member of the Council of His Excellency the Governor, Madras.

1921
Charles George Todhunter  Indian Civil Service, Member of the Executive Council, Madras
Sir Henry Wheeler  Indian Civil Service, Member of the Executive Council, Bengal
 Sir Edward Douglas MacLagan, Governor-Designate of the Punjab.
 The Right Honourable Sir Satyendra Prassano, Baron Sinha of Raipur, Governor of Bihar and Orissa.
 Sir Nicholas Dodd Beatson-Bell, Governor-Designate of Assam.
 Sir William Sinclair Marris, Governor-Designate of Assam (in succession to Sir Nicholas Beatson-Bell).
 Louis James Kershaw, Indian Civil Service, Secretary in the Revenue and Statistics Department, India Office.
 George Seymour Curtis, Indian Civil Service, Member of the Executive Council of the Governor of Bombay.
 Lionel Davidson, Indian Civil Service, Member of the Executive Council of the Governor of Madras.

1922
Raja Sir Muhammad Ali Muhammad Khan, Khan Bahadur  of Mahmudabad, Member of the Governor's Executive Council, United Provinces
Sir Jamsetjee Jejeebhoy  Bombay
Sir Sassoon Jacob David  President, Bombay Municipality
Sir William Mitchell Acworth 
William Grenfell Max Muller  His Majesty's Envoy Extraordinary and Minister Plenipotentiary to the Republic of Poland
 Captain His Highness Maharawal Shri Ranjitsinhji Mansinhji, Raja of Baria, Bombay.
 Khan Bahadur Mian Muhammad Shafi, Barrister-at-Law, Member of the Viceroy's Council.
 William Malcolm Hailey, Member of the Viceroy's Council.
 Sir Alfred Hamilton Grant, late Chief Commissioner and Agent to the Governor-General, North-West Frontier Province.

1923
 Rao Bahadur Bayya Narasimheswara Sarma, Member of the Executive Council of the Governor-General.
 Sir Ibrahim Rahimtoola, Member of the Executive Council, Bombay.
 Tej Bahadur Sapru, Member of the Viceroy's Council.
 Sir Ludovic Charles Porter, Indian Civil Service, Member of Council, United Provinces.
 Sir Richard Havelock Charles, Medical Adviser to the Secretary of State for India.

1924
His Highness Maharajadhiraja Maharao Sarup Ram Singh Bahadur, Maharao of Sirohi, Rajputana
 Charles Alexander Innes, Indian Civil Service; Member of the Governor-General's Executive Council.
 General Sir Claud William Jacob, Chief of the General Staff, India.

1925
Major His Highness Raj Rajeshwar Maharajadhiraja Umaid Singh Bahadur  Maharaja of Jodhpur, Rajputana
Sir Alexander Frederick Whyte, President, Legislative Assembly
Sir Maurice Henry Weston Hayward, Indian Civil Service, Member of the Executive Council, Bombay
Sir Abdur Rahim, Member of the Executive Council, Bengal
 Captain His Highness Maharana Shri Vijayasinhji Chhatrasinhji, Maharaja of Rajpipla.
 Sir Frederick Augustus Nicholson, Indian Civil Service (retired), Madras.

1926
Sir Alexander Phillips Muddiman  Indian Civil Service, Member of the Governor-General's Executive Council
 Lieutenant-Colonel His Highness Maharaja Sri Brajindra Sawai Kishan Singh Bahadur, Maharaja of Bharatpur.
 His Highness Nawab Mahabat Khanji Rasul Khanji, Nawab of Junagadh.
 Sir Basil Phillott Blackett, Member of the Executive Council of the Governor-General.
 Henry Staveley Lawrence, Indian Civil Service, Member of the Executive Council, Bombay.

1927
Khan Bahadur Sir Muhammad Habibullah, Sahib Bahadur  Member of the Governor-General's Executive Council
His Highness Maharaja Gulab Singh Bahadur, Maharaja of Rewa, Central India.

1928
Sir William John Keith  Indian Civil Service, late Finance Member of the Executive Council of the Governor of Burma
Sir Bhupendra Nath Mitra  Member of the Governor-General's Executive Council.
Sir Samuel Perry O'Donnell  Indian Civil Service, Member of the Executive Council of the Governor of the United Provinces.
Sir Chunilal Vijbhukhandas Mehta, Member of the Executive Council of the Governor of Bombay.

1929
 His Highness Maharaja Shri Natvarsinhji Bhavsinhji, Maharaja Rana Saheb of Porbandar, Bombay.
 James Crerar, Indian Civil Service, Member of the Governor-General's Executive Council.
 Jean Louis Rieu, Indian Civil Service, Member of the Executive Council of the Governor of Bombay.
 George Bancroft Lambert, Indian Civil Service, Member of the Executive Council of the Governor of the United Provinces.
Captain His Highness Rukn-ud-Daula Nusrat-i-Jang Hafiz-ul-Mulk Mukhlis-ud, Daula Nawab Sir Sadiq Muhammad Khan, Abbasi, Bahadur  Nawab of Bahawalpur.

1930s

1930
 Sir George Rainy, Indian Civil Service, Member of the Governor-General's Executive Council.
 Sir Denys de Saumarez Bray, Indian Civil Service (Retd.), lately Foreign Secretary to the Government of India.
 John Ernest Buttery Hotson, Indian Civil Service, Member of the Executive Council of the Governor of Bombay.
His Highness Maharaja Shri Lakhdirji Waghji, Maharaja of Morvi.

1931
 Sir George Ernest Schuster, Member of the Governor-General's Executive Council.
Lieutenant His Highness Raja Jogindar Sen Bahadur, Raja of Mandi, Punjab States.
Thakor Saheb Shri Sir Daulatsinhji Jasvatsinhji  Thakor Saheb of Limbdi, Western India States.
Sir Norman Edward Marjoribanks  Indian Civil Service (retired), Chairman, Madras Services Commission, Madras.

1932
 Khan Bahadur Mian Sir Fazl-i-Hussain, Member of the Governor-General's Executive Council.
Sir Brojendra Lal Mitter, Law Member of the Governor-General's Executive Council.
His Highness Maharaja Mahendra Sir Yadvendra Singh Bahadur  Maharaja of Panna, Central India.
Major His Highness Raja Narendra Shah  Raja of Tehri (Garhwal), United Provinces.
Sir John Perronet Thompson  Chief Commissioner of Delhi.
Major-General Sir Leonard Rogers  Indian Medical Service (retired), President, India Office Medical Board.

1933
 Captain His Highness Maharaja Aditya Narayan Singh Bahadur, Maharaja of Benares, United Provinces.
 Khan Bahadur Shaikh Sir Ghulam Hussain Hidayatullah, Member and Vice-President of the Executive Council of the Governor of Bombay.
Sir Joseph William Bhore  Indian Civil Service, Member of the Governor-General's Executive Council.
Harry Graham Haig  Indian Civil Service, Member of the Governor-General's Executive Council.
Captain Nawab Sir Muhammad Ahmad Said Khan  of Chhatari, Member of the Executive Council of the Governor of the United Provinces.
Sir Provash Chandra Mitter  Member of the Executive Council of the Governor of Bengal.
Sir Henry Duffield Craik  Indian Civil Service, Member of the Executive Council of the Governor of the Punjab.
Vice-Admiral Humphrey Thomas Walwyn  Flag Officer Commanding, and Director, Royal Indian Marine.
Sir Reginald Arthur Mant  Member of the Council of India.

1934
 Sir Frank Noyce, Indian Civil Service, Member of the Governor-General's Executive Council.
 Major His Highness Raje Bahadur Shrimant Khem Savant Bhonsle, alias Bapu Saheb, Raja of Savantvadi, Deccan States Agency.
His Highness Maharaja Chura Chand Singh  Maharaja of Manipur, Assam.
Sir Edward Maynard Deschamps Chamier  lately Legal Adviser and Solicitor to the Secretary of State for India.

1935
His Highness Rai-i-Rayan Maharawal Sri Lakshman Singh Bahadur, Maharawal of Dungarpur.
His Highness Maharaja Manikya Bir Bikram Kishore Deb Barman Bahadur, Maharaja of Tripura.
Captain His Highness Maharaja Shri Digvijaysinhji Ranjitsinhji Jadeja, Maharaja Jam Saheb of Nawanagar.
Robert Duncan Bell, Esq., C.S.I, C.I.E., Indian Civil Service, Member of the Executive Council of the Governor of Bombay.
Sir Maurice Linford Gwyer, K.C.B., K.C., First Parliamentary Counsel.
His Highness Maharaja Bhom Pal Deo Bahadur Yadukul Chandra Bhal, Maharaja of Karauli, Rajputana.
His Highness Rai-i-Rayan Maharawal Sri Lakshman Singh Bahadur, Maharawal of Dungarpur.
His Highness Maharaja Manikya Bir Bikram Kishore Deb Barman Bahadur, Maharaja of Tripura.
Captain His Highness Maharaja Shri Digvijaysinhji Ranjitsinhji Jadeja, Maharaja Jam Saheb of Nawanagar.
Robert Duncan Bell, Esq., C.S.I, C.I.E., Indian Civil Service, Member of the Executive Council of the Governor of Bombay.
Sir Maurice Linford Gwyer, K.C.B., K.C., First Parliamentary Counsel.

1936
 Saramad-i-Rajaha-i-Bundelkhand Sawai Mahendra Maharaja Shri Vir Singh Deo Bahadur, Maharaja of Orchha, Central India.
 Rana Bhagat Chand, Raja of Jubbal, Simla Hill States, Punjab.
Captain His Highness Ali Jah, Farzand-i-Dilpazir-i- Daulat-i-Inglishia, Mukhlis ud-Daula, Nasir ul-Mulk, Amir ul-Umara, Nawab Sayyid Muhammad Raza Ali Khan Bahadur, Mustaid Jang, Nawab of Rampur, United Provinces.
Sir Nripendra Nath Sircar, Member of the Governor-General's Executive Council.
Sir Percy James Grigg  Member of the Governor-General's Executive Council.
Captain His Highness Maharana Shri Sir Amarsinhji Banesinhji  Maharana Raj Sahib of Wankaner, States of Western India.
Sir Reginald Isidore Robert Glancy  Indian Civil Service (retired), Member of the Council of India.
Sir Maneckji Byramji Dadabhoy  President of the Council of State.
General Sir Padma Shumshere Jung Bahadur Rana  Commander-in-Chief, Nepal.

1937
Sir Osborne Arkell Smith,  Governor of the Reserve Bank of India.
Kanwar Sir Jagdish Prasad, CSI, CIE, OBE
Sir Muhammad Zafarullah Khan
Mir Sir Muhammad Nazim Khan, the Mir of Hunza, KCIE

1938
 His Highness Maharaja Shri Krishna Kumarsinhji Bhavsinhji, Maharaja of Bhavnagar, States of Western India.
 His Highness Maharaj Rana Rajendra Singh Bahadur, Maharaj Rana of Jhalawar, Rajputana.
His Highness Maharawat Ram Singh Bahadur, Maharawat of Pratapgarh, Rajputana

1939
 His Highness Maharaja Sir Tashi Namgyal, Maharaja of Sikkim.
Reginald Maitland Maxwell,  Indian Civil Service, Member of the Governor-General's Executive Council.
Maharana Shri Bhavani Sinhji Bahadur, Maharana of Danta, Rajputana.
Thakor Saheb Shri Sir Bahadursinhji Mansinhji,  Thakor Saheb of Palitana, States of Western India.

1940s

1940

1941
 His Highness Maharaja Vikramsinha Rao Puar, Maharaja of Dewas, Senior Branch, Central India.
 Sir Andrew Gourlay Clow, Indian Civil Service, Member of the Governor General's Executive Council.
 Sir Abraham Jeremy Raisman, Indian Civil Service, Member of the Governor General's Executive Council.
Lieutenant His Highness Raja Har Indar Singh Bahadur, Raja of Faridkot.
Sir Francis Lewis Castle Floud, K.C.B., K.C.M.G., Chairman, Land Revenue Commission, Bengal.
Sir Chetput Pattabhirama Ayyar Ramaswami Ayyar, K.C.I.E., Diwan, Travanoore State.

1942
 Diwan Bahadur Sir Arcot Ramaswami Mudaliar, Member of the Governor-General's Executive Council.

1943
Lieutenant His Highness Maharaja Shri Sewai Tej Singhji Bahadur, Maharaja of Alwar.
Sir Girija Shankar Bajpai, Indian Civil Service, Agent-General for India in the United States of America.
Sir Thomas Guthrie Russell, K.C.I.E., Director-General, Munitions Production, Department of Supply, Government of India.ref>United Kingdom and British Empire: </ref>
Lieutenant-General Cyril Dupre Noyes, C.B., C.I.E., M.C., Indian Army, General Officer Commanding-in-Chief, North-Western Army.ref>United Kingdom and British Empire: </ref>

1944
Henry Foley Knight, Indian Civil Service, Adviser to His Excellency the Governor of Bombay.

1945
The Honourable Sir Edward Charles Benthall, Member of the Governor-General's Executive Council.
The Honourable Khan Bahadur Sir Muhammad Usman Sahib Bahadur, KCIE, Member of the Governor-General's Executive Council.

1946
Captain His Highness Raja Shrimant Sir Chintamanrao Dhundirao alias Appasaheb Patwardhan, KCIE, Raja of Sangli.
The Honourable Sir Jwala Prasad Srivastava, KBE, Member of the Governor-General's Executive Council.
The Honourable Sardar Sir Jogendra Singh, Member of the Governor-General's Executive Council.
The Honourable Khan Bahadur Maulvi Sir Muhammad Azizul Haque, CIE, Member of the Governor-General's Executive Council.
Major-General (Local Lieutenant-General) Gordon Wilson, CB, CBE, MC, KHS, British Service (late RAMC), Director, Medical Services in India.
Major-General (Temporary Lieutenant-General) Alfred Reade Godwin-Austen, CB, OBE, MC, British Service, Principal Administrative Officer, General Headquarters, India.
Rao Bahadur Sir Vangal Thiruvenkata Krishnamachari, KCIE, lately Dewan, Baroda State.
Captain His Highness Farzand-i-Arjmand Aqidat Paiwand-i-Daulat-i-Inglishia Barar Bans Sarmur, Raja-i-Rajagan, Maharaja Pratap Singh Malvendra Baha-Dur, Maharaja of Nabha.
Lieutenant-Colonel Nawab Malik Khizar Hayat Khan Tiwana, Premier of the Punjab.
Sir Geoffrey Pownall Burton, Indian Civil Service, Financial Adviser to His Excellency the Governor of the Central Provinces and Berar.

1947
 Lieutenant-General Sir Frank Walter Messervy, Indian Army, General Officer Commanding-in-Chief, Northern Command, India.
 Sir George Hemming Spence, Indian Civil Service, Secretary to the Government of India in the Legislative Department.

1948
 Colonel His Highness Maharao Bhim Singhji Bahadur, Maharao of Kotah.
 Sir David Taylor Monteath, lately His Majesty's Under-Secretary of State for India.
 Vice-Admiral Sir Geoffrey John Audley Miles, Royal Navy, Commander-in-Chief, Royal Indian Navy.
 Major-General (Local Lieutenant-General) Treffry Owen Thompson, Director of Medical Services, India.
 Sir John Thorne Masey Bennett, Indian Police, Inspector-General of Police, Punjab.

References

See also
Order of the Star of India

 
Star of India